This is the complete list of Olympic medalists in Greco-Roman wrestling.

Current program

Bantamweight
 58 kg: 1924–1928
 56 kg: 1932–1936
 57 kg: 1948–1996
 58 kg: 2000
 55 kg: 2004–2012
 59 kg: 2016
 60 kg: 2020–present

Lightweight
 66.6 kg: 1908
 67.5 kg: 1912–1928
 66 kg: 1932–1936
 67 kg: 1948–1960
 70 kg: 1964–1968
 68 kg: 1972–1996
 69 kg: 2000
 66 kg: 2004–2016
 67 kg: 2020–present

Welterweight
 72 kg: 1932–1936
 73 kg: 1948–1960
 78 kg: 1964–1968
 74 kg: 1972–1996
 76 kg: 2000
 74 kg: 2004–2012
 75 kg: 2016
 77 kg: 2020–present

Middleweight
 73 kg: 1908
 75 kg: 1912–1928
 79 kg: 1932–1960
 87 kg: 1964–1968
 82 kg: 1972–1996
 85 kg: 2000
 84 kg: 2004–2012
 85 kg: 2016
 87 kg: 2020–present

Heavyweight
 +82.5 kg: 1912–1928
 +87 kg: 1932–1960
 +97 kg: 1964–1968
 100 kg: 1972–1996
 97 kg: 2000
 96 kg: 2004–2012
 98 kg: 2016
 97 kg: 2020–present

Super heavyweight
 +93 kg: 1908
 +100 kg: 1972–1984
 130 kg: 1988–2000
 120 kg: 2004–2012
 130 kg: 2016–present

Discontinued events

Light flyweight
 48 kg: 1972–1996

Flyweight
 52 kg: 1948–1996
 54 kg: 2000

Featherweight
 60 kg: 1912–1920
 62 kg: 1924–1928
 61 kg: 1932–1960
 63 kg: 1964–1968
 62 kg: 1972–1996
 63 kg: 2000
 60 kg: 2004–2012

Light heavyweight
 93 kg: 1908
 82.5 kg: 1912–1928
 87 kg: 1932–1960
 97 kg: 1964–1968
 90 kg: 1972–1996

Openweight

See also

Wrestling at the 1906 Intercalated Games — these Intercalated Games are no longer regarded as official Games by the International Olympic Committee
List of World and Olympic Champions in Greco-Roman wrestling

References
International Olympic Committee results database

Wrestling Greco-Roman
medalists

Olympic Greco-Roman
Greco-Roman wrestling

tr:Olimpiyat Oyunları'nda madalya dağılımı/Güreş